2009 Shonan Bellmare season

Competitions

Player statistics

Other pages
 J. League official site

Shonan Bellmare
Shonan Bellmare seasons